Sarpogrelate (former developmental code names MCI-9042, LS-187,118) is a drug which acts as an antagonist at the 5HT2A and 5-HT2B receptors. It blocks serotonin-induced platelet aggregation, and has applications in the treatment of many diseases including diabetes mellitus, Buerger's disease, Raynaud's disease, coronary artery disease, angina pectoris, and atherosclerosis.

See also 
 Cinanserin
 Naftidrofuryl

References 

5-HT2 antagonists
Phenol ethers
Carboxylate esters
Dimethylamino compounds